Sensorimotor or sensory-motor may refer to:

 Sensory motor amnesia
 Sensorimotor rhythm
 Sensory-motor coupling
 The sensorimotor stage in Piaget's theory of cognitive development